Saproscincus czechurai, also known commonly as Czechura's litter-skink, Czechura's skink, and the wedge-snouted shadeskink, is a species of lizard in the family Scincidae. The species is endemic to Queensland in Australia.

Etymology
The specific name, czechurai, is in honor of Australian herpetologist Gregory Vincent Czechura.

Habitat
The preferred natural habitat of C. czechurai is forest, at altitudes above .

Reproduction
S. czechurai is oviparous.

References

Further reading
Cogger HG (2014). Reptiles and Amphibians of Australia, Seventh Edition. Clayton, Victoria, Australia: CSIRO Publishing. xxx + 1,033 pp. .
Ingram GJ, Rawlinson PA (1981). "Five new species of skinks (genus Lampropholis) from Queensland and New South Wales". Memoirs of the Queensland Museum 20 (2): 311–317. (Lampropholis czechurai, new species).
Wilson S, Swan G (2013). A Complete Guide to Reptiles of Australia, Fourth Edition. Sydney: New Holland Publishers. 522 pp. .

Saproscincus
Reptiles described in 1981
Skinks of Australia
Endemic fauna of Australia
Taxa named by Glen Joseph Ingram
Taxa named by Peter Alan Rawlinson